On Joo-wan (born Song Jeong-sik on December 11, 1983) is a South Korean actor. He won widespread praise for his leading role in the film The Peter Pan Formula, and also appeared in My Mighty Princess, 12 Signs of Love, and The Five.

Filmography

Film

Television series

Variety show

Hosting

Radio show

Theater

Awards and nominations

References

External links

 On Joo-wan at Will Entertainment 
 
 
 

South Korean male film actors
South Korean male television actors
1983 births
Living people
Seoul Institute of the Arts alumni